Toongo (Tòòngò) is a Gbaya language of the Central African Republic. Its speakers identify as ethnically Buli, but the languages, though closely related, are distinct.

References

Gbaya languages
Languages of the Central African Republic